Lachlan (Lachie) Miller (born 14 August 1994) is an Australian rugby league footballer who plays as a er or  for the Newcastle Knights in the NRL. He previously played for the Cronulla-Sutherland Sharks.

Playing career

Rugby sevens
Miller was a member of the Australian men's rugby sevens' squad at the Tokyo 2020 Olympics. The team came third in their pool round and then lost to Fiji 19-nil in the quarterfinal.

2022
In round 11 of the 2022 NRL season, Miller made his first grade debut for Cronulla and scored a try in the clubs 25-18 victory over the Gold Coast.
Miller played for Cronulla in their elimination final loss to South Sydney.

2023
In January, Miller was released from his Cronulla contract to sign a three-year deal with the Newcastle Knights.

In round 1 of the 2023 NRL season, Miller made his Newcastle debut in the club's 12-20 loss to the New Zealand Warriors. In round 3, Miller scored two tries for Newcastle in their 36-20 loss against the Dolphins.

Statistics

NRL
 Statistics are correct as of the end of the 2022 season

References

External links
Newcastle Knights profile
Cronulla Sharks profile
 

1994 births
Australian rugby league players
Living people
Male rugby sevens players
Olympic rugby sevens players of Australia
Rugby sevens players at the 2020 Summer Olympics
Cronulla-Sutherland Sharks players
Newcastle Knights players
Rugby league fullbacks
Rugby league wingers
Rugby league halfbacks
Rugby league players from Coffs Harbour